Hypaedalea lobipennis is a moth of the family Sphingidae. It is known from West Africa, including Cameroon and Uganda.

The length of the forewings is about 22 mm. The abdomen is olive-brown dorsally, with a narrow double dark dorsal line. The underside of the head and body is light creamy-buff. The forewing upperside has a very jagged black submarginal line running from the apex to the tornus. It is edged proximally with pinkish-brown. The discal spot is small and black and surrounded by a paler area. The forewing underside is pale brick-brown, shading darker towards base. The distal area is uniformly purplish-brown. The hindwing upperside is dark blackish-brown, but paler along the costa.

References

Macroglossini
Moths described in 1913
Insects of Cameroon
Insects of Uganda
Moths of Africa